Lee Cox may refer to:

 Lee Cox (athlete) (born 1981), Paralympic athlete from Australia
 Lee Cox (footballer) (born 1990), English professional footballer

See also
Ricky L. Cox (born 1958), American politician in Kentucky